Op.22 Y-Waltz: in Minor is the second single album by South Korean singer Jo Yu-ri. It was released by Wake One Entertainment on October 24, 2022, and contains three tracks, including the lead single "Loveable".

Background and release
On October 10, 2022, Wake One Entertainment announced Jo Yu-ri would be releasing her second single album titled Op.22 Y-Waltz: in Minor with "Loveable" serving as the lead single on October 24. A day later, the promotional schedule was released. On October 15, the track listing was released. On October 21, the music video teaser for "Loveable" was released. The single album was released alongside the music video for "Loveable" on October 24.

Composition
Op.22 Y-Waltz: in Minor consists of three tracks. The lead single "Loveable" was described as a pop rock song characterized by "rhythmic guitar riffs and powerful drum"  with lyrics that delivers "the message of positivity and hope of 'anyone can share love'". The second track "Blank" was described as a contemporary R&B song with lyrics that "expresses the will to love". The third track "Favorite Part" was described as song with lyrics about "wanting someone to know a small and precious secret that only you knows".

Commercial performance
Op.22 Y-Waltz: in Minor debuted at number six on South Korea's Circle Album Chart in the chart issue dated October 23–29, 2022.

Track listing

Charts

Weekly charts

Monthly charts

Sales

Release history

References

External links
 

Jo Yu-ri albums
Wake One Entertainment single albums
Stone Music Entertainment albums